William Forbes (25 May 1922 – 31 January 1999) was a Scottish footballer, who played for Dunfermline Athletic, Wolverhampton Wanderers, Preston North End and Carlisle United.

References

External links

1922 births
1999 deaths
Footballers from Glasgow
Scottish footballers
Association football wing halves
Dunfermline Athletic F.C. players
Wolverhampton Wanderers F.C. players
Preston North End F.C. players
Carlisle United F.C. players
Scottish Football League players
English Football League players
FA Cup Final players